The Highway 127 Corridor Sale, also called the 127 Yard Sale, is an outdoor second-hand sale held annually for four days beginning the first Thursday in August along U.S. Route 127 (US 127). The event has been promoted as "The World's Longest Yard Sale."

History 
The original idea came from Fentress County, Tennessee, county executive Mike Walker, and was established in 1987. When it began, the sale route followed US 127 from Covington, Kentucky, to Chattanooga, Tennessee. A few years after the event was established, the Lookout Mountain Parkway was added to the route, extending it from Chattanooga southward through northwestern Georgia and northeastern Alabama to Gadsden. In 2006, the route was extended northward from Covington, through Ohio to the Michigan border, making its last major stops around Bryan, Ohio, and points northward. In 2010, the sale was extended northward to Hudson, Michigan.

Southern extension of the yard sale route 
The Lookout Mountain Parkway extension of the yard sale route through Alabama and Georgia include the roadways listed below.  
In DeKalb County, Alabama: 
Tabor Road off Alabama State Route 211 (Noccalula Road) from Gadsden northeast to Collinsville
Alabama State Route 176 from Collinsville to Dogtown, Alabama,
DeKalb County  to Mentone, Alabama, and
Alabama State Route 117 to the Georgia state line. 
In Chatooga, Dade, and Walker Counties, Georgia: 
Georgia State Route 48 to the GA 157 junction in Cloudland, Georgia,
Georgia State Route 157 north  to the GA 136 junction, 
Georgia State Route 136 west to the GA 189 junction, and
Georgia State Route 189 to the Tennessee state line on Lookout Mountain.
In southern Hamilton County, Tennessee: 
Tennessee State Route 148 in Lookout Mountain, and
 from the SR 148 junction to the Interstate 24 interchange in downtown Chattanooga.
Downtown Chattanooga is the only area along the yard sale route that is not participating in the yard sale due to high volume of traffic. Bargain hunters/travelers looking to continue shopping are to use I-124/US 27 north to exit at the Signal Mountain Road exit, where US 127 begins.

Media
The event was featured on HGTV in 2006.

See also
400-Mile Sale - annual yard sale along U.S. Route 68 in Kentucky
Roller Coaster Fair

References

External links
 Highway 127 Corridor Sale Official Site
 127YardSale.com

Retail markets in the United States
Events in Alabama
Events in Georgia (U.S. state)
Events in Kentucky
Events in Michigan
Events in Ohio
Events in Tennessee
Tourist attractions in Alabama
Tourist attractions in Georgia (U.S. state)
Tourist attractions in Kentucky
Tourist attractions in Michigan
Tourist attractions in Ohio
Tourist attractions in Tennessee
U.S. Route 127
August events
1987 establishments in the United States